Zeleneč may refer to:

Zeleneč, Czech Republic
Zeleneč, Slovakia